Maggie Behle (born 1 January 1980) is an American Paralympic female alpine skier.

She was born without a right leg and started to engage with alpine skiing at the age of five. She became one of the members of the US Disabled ski team at the age of 13.

Career 
Behle competed at the 1996 World Championship in Lech, Austria winning two silver metals as well as competing at the 1997 World Cup in Pra Loup, France, winning a gold metal in slalom. Behle competed at the 1998 Winter Paralympics at the age of 17, which is also her only appearance in a Winter Paralympic event and competed in the alpine skiing event claiming bronze medals in the women's slalom and downhill categories. After claiming bronze medals at the 1998 Winter Paralympics, she was honoured at the Rowland Hall-St. Mark's School where she was educated.

References 

1980 births
Living people
American female alpine skiers
Alpine skiers at the 1998 Winter Paralympics
Paralympic alpine skiers of the United States
Paralympic medalists in alpine skiing
Paralympic bronze medalists for the United States
Medalists at the 1998 Winter Paralympics
21st-century American women